Košir, sometimes Germanized Koschier, is a Slovenian surname. Notable people with the surname include:

Dejan Košir (born 1973), Slovenian snowboarder
Jure Košir (born 1972), Slovenian alpine skier
Lovrenc Košir (1804–1879), Austrian civil servant
Manca Košir (born 1948), Slovenian journalist and actress
Nick Kosir, American meteorologist 
Žan Košir (born 1984), Slovenian snowboarder

See also
 

Slovene-language surnames